Centennial High School is one of twelve public high schools in the Frisco Independent School District in Frisco, Texas, United States. It serves grades nine through twelve. In 2022, the school was rated "A" by the Texas Education Agency.

History 
The school opened in the fall of 2003, initially to serve 9th and 10th graders. It was the second to open in the district, after Frisco High School. At the time, the school served all of the school district's area east of Preston Road as well as portions of north Plano and western McKinney. The first graduating class from the high school graduated in spring 2006.

The school's enrollment grew quickly, fueled by Frisco's record growth. As early as 2006–2007, Centennial had exceeded its capacity of 1800 students, and in the fall of 2006 Liberty High School was opened to help relieve this overcrowding. Despite the addition of several new wings and classrooms during the 2011–2012 school year which brought total capacity to 2,100 students, Centennial became overcrowded once again, peaking at an enrollment of 2,190 in 2013–2014. In compliance with the district's policy of keeping school sizes small, a portion of the school's attendance zone was allocated to that of Independence High School in 2014. In the fall of 2016, the opening of the district's ninth high school, Lebanon Trail High School, further lowered enrollment at Centennial. The school's attendance zone is currently built up.

Athletics

The Centennial Titans compete in the following sports:

 Baseball
 Basketball
 Cross country
Drill Team (Centennial Sweethearts)
 Football – earned first state playoff berth in 2008
 Golf
 Hockey
 Powerlifting
 Soccer – 2016 UIL State 5A Champions
 Softball
 Swimming and diving
 Tennis
 Track and field
 Volleyball
 Wrestling – 2014 Dual State Champions; 2014 UIL State Champions; 2015 Dual State Champions; 2015 UIL State Champions; 2016 Dual State Finalist; 2016 UIL Runner-up, 2020 Dual State Championship

Academics

Centennial High School has gotten back to back exemplary rankings every year from 2009 to 2012, and is the only school in its category to get such rankings. At present, the school is still rated "Exemplary" by the Texas Education Agency. Students at Centennial scored an average of 1123 on the SAT and 24.7 on the ACT as of 2016.

Notable alumni 
 Delaney Miller, professional rock climber
 Seth Elledge, MLB pitcher for the St. Louis Cardinals

References

External links
 FCHS webpage

Educational institutions established in 2003
High schools in Collin County, Texas
Frisco Independent School District high schools
Frisco, Texas
2003 establishments in Texas